Saint Philomena School or Saint Philomena Catholic School may refer to:

United Kingdom:
 St Philomena's Catholic High School for Girls, London
 St. Philomena's School, Frinton-on-Sea, England

United States:
 St. Philomena Catholic School, Carson, California (Los Angeles area)
 St. Philomena School, Peoria, Illinois
 Saint Philomena School, Portsmouth, Rhode Island
 St. Philomena Catholic School, Des Moines, Washington